Jeremy Sprinkle (born August 10, 1994) is an American football tight end who is a free agent. He played college football at Arkansas and was drafted by the Washington Redskins in the fifth round of the 2017 NFL Draft.

Early years
Sprinkle attended and played high school football at White Hall High School.

College career
Sprinkle attended and played college football at Arkansas from 2012–2016 under head coaches John L. Smith and Bret Bielema. He redshirted as a true freshman. In the 2013 season, fellow freshman Hunter Henry received most of the targets at the tight end position. Sprinkle recorded four receptions for 68 yards on the season. In the 2014 season, Henry and senior A. J. Derby received most of the production at the position. Sprinkle recorded seven receptions for 84 yards and a receiving touchdown on the season. Sprinkle's role expanded in the 2015 season. Although Henry recorded a majority of the production, Sprinkle had 27 receptions for 389 yards and six touchdowns. With the loss of Henry to the 2016 NFL Draft, Sprinkle took over the production at the position in the 2016 season. He shared time with newcomers Austin Cantrell, C. J. O'Grady, and Grayson Gunter. He recorded 33 receptions for 380 yards and four touchdowns.

Collegiate statistics

Professional career
On November 28, 2016, it was announced that Sprinkle had accepted his invitation to play in the 2017 Senior Bowl, along with Arkansas' punter Toby Baker. On January 28, 2017, Sprinkle played in the Senior Bowl and caught one 18-yard pass from Pitts's Nathan Peterman. He was a part of Chicago Bears' head coach John Fox's North team, who lost 16-15 to the South. Sprinkle was one of 19 tight ends who received an invitation to participate at the NFL Scouting Combine in Indianapolis, Indiana. Sprinkle performed the majority of drills and had a mediocre performance, finishing 14th among tight ends in the vertical jump and 10th in the 40-yard dash and broad jump. On March 15, 2017, Sprinkle opted to participate at Arkansas' pro day, along with Cody Hollister, Dan Skipper, Jeremiah Ledbetter, and 13 other prospects. Sprinkle chose to perform all.of his combine drills after his showing at the combine was lackluster. He successfully had better times and measures in all of them. At the conclusion of the pre-draft process, Sprinkle was projected to be a fourth or fifth round pick by NFL draft experts and scouts. He was ranked the fifth best tight end in the draft by NFL analyst Gil Brandt, the eighth best tight end by NFL analyst Mike Mayock, and the 11th best tight end prospect in the draft by NFLDraftScout.com.

Washington Redskins / Football Team

The Washington Redskins selected Sprinkle in the fifth round (154th overall pick) of the 2017 NFL Draft. On May 11, 2017, Sprinkle signed his four-year rookie contract, worth 2.67 million contract. Throughout training camp, Sprinkle competed for a roster spot with Niles Paul and Derek Carrier. Head coach Jay Gruden named him the fourth tight end on the depth chart to start the regular season, behind veterans Jordan Reed, Vernon Davis, and Niles Paul.

He made his professional regular season debut and first career start during a Week 3 matchup against the Oakland Raiders after being inactive for the first two games. Sprinkle earned the start after Jordan Reed suffered a hamstring injury and was unable to play. Although he was held without a catch, the Redskins went on to win 27-10. Sprinkle was a healthy scratch from Weeks 6-8 after Reed returned from injury. He was activated by the Redskins in Week 9 after Reed aggravated his hamstring injury. On November 19, 2017, Sprinkle caught his first career reception on a seven-yard touchdown pass from quarterback Kirk Cousins during Washington's 34-31 loss at the New Orleans Saints. Overall, he played in 11 games in his rookie season and recorded two receptions for 13 yards and a touchdown.

Dallas Cowboys

Sprinkle signed with the Dallas Cowboys on April 7, 2021. He was released on August 31, 2021 and re-signed to the practice squad the next day. He was signed to the active roster on October 16.

On March 15, 2022, Sprinkle re-signed with the Cowboys. He was placed on injured reserve on August 23, 2022. He was released on August 26.

Statistics

Personal life
On December 27, 2016, Sprinkle was involved in a shoplifting incident during a Belk Bowl sponsored event in Charlotte, North Carolina. Players from Virginia Tech and Arkansas, who were playing in the upcoming Belk Bowl, were each given a Fossil watch, a $450 gift card, and 90 minutes to shop at a Belk store in the SouthPark Mall. Sprinkle concealed eight items worth an estimated $260 from his bag and attempted to steal the items. Charlotte-Mecklenburg Police Department responded to the incident. He was released later that night after being cited for unlawful concealment. He was suspended two hours before the 2016 Belk Bowl.

References

External links
 
 Dallas Cowboys bio
 Arkansas Razorbacks bio

1994 births
Living people
African-American players of American football
American football tight ends
Arkansas Razorbacks football players
Dallas Cowboys players
People from Jefferson County, Arkansas
Players of American football from Arkansas
Washington Redskins players
Washington Football Team players
21st-century African-American sportspeople